Benthophiloides is a genus of gobies widespread in the basins of the Black Sea and the Caspian Sea.

Species
There are currently two recognized species in this genus:
 Benthophiloides brauneri Beling & Iljin, 1927
 Benthophiloides turcomanus (Iljin, 1941)

References

 
Ray-finned fish genera
Taxonomy articles created by Polbot